Naaman ( Naʿămān, "pleasantness") the Aramean was a commander of the armies of Ben-Hadad II, the king of Aram-Damascus, in the time of Joram, king of Israel.

According to the Bible, Naaman was a commander of the army of Syria.  He was a good commander and was held in favor because of the victory that God brought him.  Yet Naaman was a leper.  Naaman's wife had a servant girl from Israel who said that a prophet there would be able to heal him. Naaman tells his lord this and he is sent to Israel with a letter to the king.  The king of Israel didn't know what to do, yet Elisha (Eliseus) sent a message to the King, advising that the King tell Naaman to come to see him. Elisha then told Naaman to go bathe in the Jordan seven times and he would be clean.  Naaman was angry and would have left, but his servant asked him to try it and he was healed. A servant of Elisha, Gehazi, seeing Naaman being turned away from offering God offerings, ran after him and falsely asked for clothing and silver for visitors. And the leprosy from Naaman fell on Gehazi and would remain in his descendants.

Tanakh
Naaman is mentioned in 2 Kings 5 of the Tanakh in Hebrew as "וְ֠נַעֲמָן שַׂר־ צְבָ֨א מֶֽלֶךְ־ אֲרָ֜ם" or "Naaman captain of the army of the King of Aram".

According to the narrative, he is called a mezora (מְּצֹרָע), a person affected by the skin disease tzaraath (צָּרַעַת, tzara'at). When the Hebrew slave-girl who waits on his wife tells her of a Jewish prophet in Samaria who can cure her master, he obtains a letter from King Ben-Hadad II of Aram to King Joram of Israel in which Ben-Hadad asks Joram to arrange for the healing of his subject Naaman. Naaman proceeds with the letter to King Joram. The king of Israel suspects in this – to him – impossible request a pretext of Syria for later starting a war against him, and tears his clothes.

When the prophet Elisha hears about this, he sends for general Naaman. But rather than personally receiving Naaman when the latter arrives at Elisha's house, Elisha merely sends a messenger to the door who tells Naaman to cure his affliction by dipping himself seven times in the Jordan River. Naaman, a man of heathen faith who is unfamiliar with the Jewish mezora, had expected the prophet himself to come out to him and to perform some kind of impressive ritual magic; he angrily refuses, and prepares to go home unhealed. Only after Naaman's slaves suggest to their master that he has nothing to lose by at least giving it a try since the task is a simple and easy one, he takes his bath in the Jordan river as a mikveh as instructed and finds himself healed. (The mikveh is a bath used for ritual immersion in Judaism.)

Naaman returns to Elisha with lavish gifts, which Elisha flatly refuses to accept. Naaman also renounces his former god Rimmon after being cured by Elisha - acknowledges solely the God of Israel.
He does, however, ask for sacrificial altar soil to be given him to take back home and that the God of Israel pardon him when he enters the temple of Rimmon as part of his obligations to the king of Syria.

Rabbinic literature
According to Rabbinic teaching, Naaman was the archer who drew his bow at a venture and mortally wounded Ahab, King of Israel. This event is alluded to in the words "because by him the Lord had given deliverance unto Syria", and therefore the Syrian king, Naaman's master, was Benhadad. Naaman is represented as vain and haughty, on account of which he was stricken with leprosy. Tanhuma however, says that Naaman was stricken with leprosy for taking an Israelitish maiden and making her his wife's servant. Naaman was a "ger toshav," that is, he was not a perfect proselyte, having accepted only some of the commandments. The Mekhilta, however, places Naaman's conversion above Jethro's.

As the object of the narrative of Naaman's sickness and restoration to health is, apparently, to form a link in the long series of miracles performed by Elisha, the redactor of II Kings did not concern himself to indicate the time when this event occurred. The rabbinical tradition that Naaman was the archer who mortally wounded Ahab seems to have been adopted by Josephus. If the tradition is correct, the Syrian king whom Naaman served must have been Ben-hadad II; but as the interval between the death of Ahab and the curing of Naaman's leprosy is not known, it is impossible to identify the King of Israel to whom Naaman was sent with a letter. Ewald thinks the king referred to was Jehoahaz, while Schenkel suggests Jehu, but the general view is that it was Jehoram. The passage ("because by him the Lord had given deliverance unto Syria," II Kings 5:1) upon which the identification of Naaman with Ahab's slayer is based by the Rabbis is referred by G. Rawlinson, however, to the Syrian triumph over Shalmaneser II.

The request of Naaman to be permitted to carry away two mules' burden of Israelite earth for the purpose of erecting upon it an altar on which to offer sacrifices to Yhwh, reflects the belief of those days that the god of each land could be worshiped only on his own soil. The expression "So he departed from him a little way" (כברת ארץ; verse ) seems to contradict the assertion of Naaman's intention to return to Syria with the two loads of earth. The word כברת is transliterated in the Septuagint (Vatican) δεβραθα and (Lucian) χαβραθα, while the Alexandrian codex has καὶ ἀπῆλθεν ἀπ' ἀυτōν ἀπό τῆς γῆς Ἰσραηλ, apparently reading מארץ ישראל וילך מאתו. Klostermann, while supplying, with the Alexandrian codex, the word ישראל, connects this passage with Naaman's departure with the loads of earth, and renders the passage וילך מאתו כבר מארץ ישראל as "and he carried away from him about a cor of the earth of Israel."

New Testament
Naaman is also mentioned in Luke 4 of the New Testament, in Greek as "Ναιμὰν ὁ Σύρος" or "Naaman the Syrian", a leper.

Christian theology depicts Naaman as an example for the will of God to save people who are considered by men as less than pious and unworthy of salvation. 
The Septuagint, the Greek Old Testament, uses the word baptizein for the dipping that heals the heathen Naaman from the skin disease called tzaraath. The new baptism takes place in the Jordan River where Jesus of Nazareth, also called the Christ by his followers, was baptized many centuries later.

See also
 Gehazi
 Naamah (disambiguation)
 Nu'man

References

Sources

Books of Kings people
Arameans
Military personnel of antiquity
9th-century BC people